Arthur Cox is an Irish corporate law firm headquartered in Dublin, with offices in Belfast, London, New York City, and San Francisco. It is one of Ireland's leading law firms, being the largest by revenue and the third largest by number of practicing solicitors.

In 2020, it was estimated to be the nineteenth largest firm by revenue in Europe (excluding the United Kingdom).

History 
Arthur Cox & Co commenced practice in 1920 at 5 St Stephen's Green, in a premises shared with JS Evans & Co. Ltd. There were two partners – Arthur Cox and John McArevey. The firm initially benefitted from instructions from Sir Horace Plunkett, South Dublin Unionist Party MP, who Cox had met through a friend's membership of The Arts Club. This was despite Cox's father's close friendship with John Dillon, who had been a lifelong opponent of Plunkett's. The firm was involved in certain aspects of the negotiations of the Anglo-Irish Treaty, with Cox claiming to have traveled to London by mail boat on eight occasions. The principal business of the firm in its early years was Cox assisting his University College Dublin friends, Ministers Kevin O'Higgins, Patrick Hogan, Patrick McGilligan, who were engaged in the building of the Irish Free State. In 1922, the firm was instructed by the first Attorney General of Ireland, Hugh Kennedy, to prepare an opinion on the legal status of the Irish Free State in the aftermath of the Anglo-Irish Treaty, with Cox having been part of the delegation sent to London in 1921 to negotiate the terms of the treaty, whereas Kennedy had not been, to the regret of Michael Collins.

Arthur Cox & Co acted as solicitors to the Irish White Cross, set up in 1920 to relieve the distress of the civilian population after the arrival of the Black and Tans. Arthur advised Áine Ceannt on her role as secretary and trustee of the association.

Cox was widely acknowledged to be the architect of the Companies Act, 1963.

Eugene McCague served as managing partner of the firm from 1999 to 2003, and as chairman from 2006 to 2013.

Current practice 
In 2011, Arthur Cox advised the Government of Ireland in relation to Ireland's sovereign bailout under the European Financial Stability Facility.

In 2015, Minister for Health, Leo Varadkar recommended that Arthur Cox stop representing tobacco companies, as Arthur Cox also represents the Irish Health Service Executive.

Arthur Cox was the top M&A legal advisor in Ireland in 2019 by both deal value and deal volume.

In 2019, Arthur Cox was the subject of protests by the family of a Christian, former associate.

In 2019, Geoff Moore took over as managing partner of the firm from Brian O'Gorman.

Arthur Cox acts for Green REIT plc in relation to planning matters.

In response to the COVID-19 pandemic, Arthur Cox announced it would not be paying bonuses to staff and would be "significantly reducing" partnership drawings.

References

External links 
 

Law firms of Ireland
Law firms established in 1920
Irish companies established in 1920
Companies based in Dublin (city)
Law firms established in the 20th century